Anuja Chandramouli (born 1986) is an Indian author of fantasy and historical fiction.

Education and career 
Chandramouli has a bachelor's degree in psychology from Women's Christian College Chennai and a master's degree in English.

She is the author of seven novels. Her works often feature protagonists from Indian mythology. She has also written novels in the high fantasy genre: Yama’s Lieutenant and its sequel Yama’s Lieutenant and the Stone Witch.

Her debut novel Arjuna: Saga of a Pandava Warrior Prince was published in 2012. In 2013, it was named as one of the top 5 books in the Indian Writing category by Amazon India. Three of her novels, Arjuna: Saga of a Pandava Warrior Prince, Kamadeva: The God of Desire and Shakti: The Divine Feminine are set to be translated.Her 2017 novel, The Burning Queen, is about Rani Padmavati, a 13th–14th century Indian queen originally described in the epic poem by Malik Muhammad Jayasi. It was published in the wake of controversy around the Padmaavat, directed by Sanjay Leela Bhansali. Her book Ganga: The Constant Goddess was published in 2018. MOHINI: THE ENCHANTRESS is the latest book released in AUGUST 2020.

2023: Anuja Chandramouli, has been bestowed with the honor of being featured on the cover of the esteemed E-magazine Storizen, (March Issue) showcasing her exceptional prowess in the realm of literature.

Personal life 
Chandramouli married in 2005, and has two daughters.

References

External links 

 Anuja Chandramouli on scandals from mythology at the Bangalore Literature Festival

1986 births
Living people
Indian women writers
Indian fantasy writers
Women science fiction and fantasy writers
Women's Christian College, Chennai alumni